Naumannella halotolerans is a Gram-positive and aerobic bacterium from the genus Naumannella which has been isolated from a pharmaceutical clean room and milk products in Sachsen-Anhalt, Germany.

References 

Propionibacteriales
Bacteria described in 2012